The Networked Transport of RTCM via Internet Protocol (NTRIP) is a protocol for streaming differential GPS (DGPS) corrections over the Internet for real-time kinematic positioning.
NTRIP is a generic, stateless protocol based on the Hypertext Transfer Protocol HTTP/1.1 and is enhanced for GNSS data streams. 

The specification is standardized by the Radio Technical Commission for Maritime Services (RTCM).
NTRIP was developed by the German Federal Agency for Cartography and Geodesy (BKG) and the Dortmund University Department of Computer Science. Ntrip was released in September 2004. The 2011 version of the protocol is version 2.0. 

NTRIP used to be an open standard protocol but it is not available freely (as of 2020). There is an open source implementation available from software.rtcm-ntrip.org from where the protocol can be reverse-engineered.

References

Global Positioning System